Illegal, or unlawful, typically describes something that is explicitly prohibited by law, or is otherwise forbidden by a state or other governing body.

Illegal may also refer to:

Law 
 Violation of law
 Crime, the practice of breaking the criminal law
 An illegal immigrant, a person that performed illegal immigration

Entertainment 
 The Illegal (novel) (2015), by Canadian writer Lawrence Hill

Films
 Illegal (1932 film), British 
 Illegal (1955 film), American 
 Illegal (2010 film), Belgian 
 The Illegal (2019), film starring Suraj Sharma

Music
 Illegal (group), a 1990s rap group
 "Illegal" (song), a track from pop singer Shakira's 2005 release, Oral Fixation Vol. 2

See also
 
 Illegal agent, also known as Operational cover
 Illegals Program, Russian spies arrested in the United States in 2010
 The Illegal (disambiguation)
 Illegalism, an anarchist philosophy which openly embraced criminality as a lifestyle